He Longhai (born 8 October 2001) is a Chinese footballer currently playing as a midfielder for Shanghai Shenhua.

Career statistics

Club
.

Notes

References

2001 births
Living people
People from Suining
Chinese footballers
China youth international footballers
Association football midfielders
Shanghai Shenhua F.C. players
21st-century Chinese people